Martha Boneta is an American policy advisor, commentator, and farmer who is known for her role in the passage of a landmark right-to-farm law in the Commonwealth of Virginia. She was featured in the 2015 documentary film Farming in Fear.

Education
Boneta earned a Juris Doctor degree from George Mason School of Law.

Career 
In 2006, Boneta purchased a 65-acre property in Paris, Virginia called Liberty Farm.
  
Boneta was featured in the 2015 documentary Farming in Fear. The film documented her farming and advocacy which resulted in numerous television appearances for Boneta.

References 

Year of birth missing (living people)
Living people
Antonin Scalia Law School alumni